Xylophanes jordani is a moth of the  family Sphingidae.

Repartition 
It is known from Costa Rica.

Description 
The wingspan is 50–56 mm. The females are larger than the males. It is similar to Xylophanes thyelia thyelia but distinguishable by the conspicuous dark brown basal area of the forewing upperside and the shape of the postmedian lines. The forewing upperside has a conspicuous dark brown basal area, bounded distally by a sharp transverse edge. The postmedian lines arising on the inner edge are much more distally than in Xylophanes thyelia thyelia or Xylophanes pyrrhus. The first and second postmedian lines are narrow, parallel and close. The fourth and fifth postmedian lines run parallel to the second postmedian line to the inner margin.

Biology 
Adults are on wing year-round.

The larvae possibly feed on Psychotria panamensis, Psychotria nervosa and Pavonia guanacastensis.

References

jordani
Moths described in 1916
Endemic fauna of Costa Rica

Moths of Central America